Philippe Georges Antoine Blain (born 20 May 1960) is a French professional volleyball coach and former player. He was a member of the France national team in 1984–1987, and a participant at the Olympic Games Seoul 1988. Blain is the current head coach of the Japan national team.

Career as coach
Since 1998 he coached in France, first at AS Cannes, then, since 2000, at Arago de Sète. Starting from 2001 he was a head coach of the France men's national volleyball team.

In 2013 he was announced a new assistant coach Stephane Antiga. They have been working with Poland men's national volleyball team. On September 21, 2014 Poland won a title of World Champion 2014. On October 27, 2014 received a state award granted by the Polish President Bronisław Komorowski – Gold Cross of Merit for outstanding contribution to the development of Polish sport.

On 29 March 2016 he signed a contract with Polish club PGE Skra Bełchatów and replaced previous head coach Miguel Angel Falasca.

Honours

As a coach
 CEV Cup
  1998/1999 – with AS Cannes
 National championships
 1994/1995  French Cup, with AS Cannes
 1994/1995  French Championship, with AS Cannes
 1997/1998  French Cup, with AS Cannes
 2016/2017  Polish Championship, with PGE Skra Bełchatów

Individual awards
 1986: FIVB World Championship – Most Valuable Player
 1987: CEV European Championship – Most Valuable Player

State awards
 2014:  Gold Cross of Merit
 2014:  Medaille de la Jeunesse et des Sports

References

External links

 
 Player profile at LegaVolley.it 
 Coach/Player profile at Volleybox.net

1960 births
Living people
Sportspeople from Montpellier
French men's volleyball players
Olympic volleyball players of France
Volleyball players at the 1988 Summer Olympics
French volleyball coaches
French Olympic coaches
Recipients of the Gold Cross of Merit (Poland)
Volleyball coaches of international teams
French expatriate sportspeople in Italy
Expatriate volleyball players in Italy
French expatriate sportspeople in Poland
French expatriate sportspeople in Japan
Skra Bełchatów coaches